Tanya Walker is a lawyer in Toronto, Ontario, Canada, practising in the field of commercial litigation. She is the proprietor of Walker Law Professional Corporation and was a part-time member of the Ontario Assessment Review Board until September 2015.

Education 

Walker obtained her law degree from Osgoode Hall Law School at York University in 2005 and an Honours Bachelor of Commerce degree with a minor in Economics from McMaster University in 2002. She has been a member of the Ontario Bar since 2006.

Community Involvement 
 
Walker is a member of the following organizations:

 Franchise Executive of the Ontario Bar Association;
 American Bar Association Forum on Franchising;

 Board of Directors of the Osgoode Hall Law School Alumni Association;
 Advocates Society;
 Canadian Association of Women Executives and Entrepreneurs;
 Canadian Association of Black Lawyers; and
 Black Business and Professional Association.

Awards 
In 2015, Walker received the Traditional Law Practice Award and the Rising Star Award.
 In 2014, Walker was presented with the Ambassador for Peace Honour by the Universal Peace Federation and the Women's Federation for World Peace.
 Walker was the recipient of the Young Entrepreneur Award from the Black Business and Professional Association in 2013.
 In 2010 and 2012, Walker was featured on the official Black History Month posters entitled "The Next Generation" and "It takes a Village to Raise a Child". These posters were displayed throughout public buildings and offices throughout Canada, including schools, fire stations and libraries.
 In 2012, the Sickle Cell Miracle Network presented Walker with the Award of Excellence for Community Service.
 Walker was selected by popular vote from amongst 19 other candidates to receive the 2010 Woman's Enterprise Woman of the Year Award.

References

External links 
 

Canadian lawyers
Living people
People from Toronto
Year of birth missing (living people)